Bernard Planque (13 January 1932 – 6 September 2016) was a French basketball player. He competed in the men's tournament at the 1952 Summer Olympics.

References

1932 births
2016 deaths
People from Villeneuve-le-Roi
French men's basketball players
Olympic basketball players of France
Basketball players at the 1952 Summer Olympics